Aggsbach Charterhouse is a former Carthusian monastery in Aggsbach Dorf in Schönbühel-Aggsbach in Lower Austria.

The monastery was founded in 1380 by Heidenreich von Maissau. It was dissolved in 1782 in the reforms of Emperor Joseph II. The premises were mostly converted for use as a castle, except for a few portions which were incorporated into the parish priest's farm. The monks' cells and the cloister were demolished.

The Carthusian church, with the addition of a tower, remains as the parish church.

Sources and external links
 Verein der Freunde der Kartause Aggsbach (Friends of Aggsbach Charterhouse) 
 Aggsbach Dorf parish website: photos of the former Carthusian church 
 Aggsbach Dorf parish website: further information 
 Monasterium.net: Kartause Aggsbach 

Carthusian monasteries in Austria
1380s establishments in the Holy Roman Empire
1380 establishments in Europe
14th-century establishments in Austria
1782 disestablishments in Austria
Monasteries in Lower Austria
1782 disestablishments in the Habsburg monarchy
1782 disestablishments in the Holy Roman Empire
Establishments in the Duchy of Austria

es:Cartuja de Aggsbach#top